Yearn2Learn is a series of two educational games for Windows and Macintosh by American studio Image Smith: Yearn2Learn: Peanuts (1994) and Yearn2Learn: Master Snoopy's World Geography (1995), based on the Peanuts series of comic books.

References 

1994 video games
1995 video games
Educational games
Classic Mac OS games
Video games based on Peanuts
Video games developed in the United States
Windows games